Cisneros is a Spanish surname. Notable people with the surname include:
 Adriana Cisneros, Venezuelan journalist and the CEO and Vice Chairman of Cisneros Group
 Al Cisneros (born 1973), American stoner metal musician
 Antonio Cisneros (born 1942), Peruvian poet
 Baltasar Hidalgo de Cisneros (1758–1829), Viceroy of the Rio de La Plata
 Carlos Cisneros (1948-2019), American politician
 Diego Cisneros (1911–1980), Venezuelan businessman
 Countess Eleonora de Cisneros (1878–1934), American opera singer and educator
 Evelyn Cisneros (born 1958), American ballet dancer
 Francesc Antoni de la Dueña y Cisneros (1753–1821), Spanish Bishop of Urgell
 Francisco Jiménez de Cisneros (1436–1517), Spanish cardinal and statesman; grand inquisitor
 Gil Cisneros (born 1971), American philanthropist and politician
 Gustavo Cisneros (born 1946), Venezuelan businessman
 Henry Cisneros (born 1947), American politician; former mayor of San Antonio & Secretary of HUD
 Ignacio Hidalgo de Cisneros (1896–1966), Spanish general of the Spanish Air Force
 José Cisneros (born 1956), American politician
 José B. Cisneros (1910–2009), Mexican-born American illustrator and artist, specializing in Texas and Southwestern history
 José Dionisio Cisneros (1796–1847), Venezuelan guerilla 
 Melchor Liñán y Cisneros (1629–1708), Spanish prelate, colonial official, and viceroy of Peru
 Octavio Cisneros (born 1945), Auxiliary Bishop Emeritus of Brooklyn, and Titular Bishop of Eanach Dúin
 Omar Cisneros (born 1989), Cuban track and field Olympic athlete
 Patricia Phelps de Cisneros, Venezuelan philanthropist
 Pedro Treto Cisneros (1939–2013), Mexican baseball organizer, manager, and writer
 Rudy Cisneros (born 1981), American professional boxer
 Sandra Cisneros (born 1954), American author and poet

With a similar last name, see Cisnero

 José L. Cisnero (born 1989) Dominican-born American baseball player

Spanish-language surnames